Steffen Wöller (born 10 September 1972 in Erfurt, Thuringia) is a German luger who competed from 1991 to 2004. He won five medals at the FIL World Luge Championships with one gold (Mixed team: 2000), three silvers (Men's doubles: 2000, 2001; Mixed team: 2001), and one bronze (Men's doubles: 1997).

Wöller also won six medals at the FIL European Luge Championships with three golds (Mixed team: 2002, 2004, 2006) and three silvers (Men's doubles: 1998, 2000; Mixed team: 2000).

He won the overall Luge World Cup title in men's doubles in 2000–1.

Wöller's best finish at the Winter Olympics was fourth in the men's doubles event at Salt Lake City in 2002.

References

Sources
 
 Hickok sports information on World champions in luge and skeleton.
 List of European luge champions 
 List of men's doubles luge World Cup champions since 1978.

External links
 

1972 births
Living people
Sportspeople from Erfurt
German male lugers
Lugers at the 1994 Winter Olympics
Lugers at the 1998 Winter Olympics
Lugers at the 2002 Winter Olympics
Olympic lugers of Germany